Tagami Station is the name of two train stations in Japan:

 Tagami Station (Gifu) (田神駅)
 Tagami Station (Niigata) (田上駅)